Alianza F.C. has had a total of  50 coaches in its history.

The first coach was  Gregorio Bundio, who he was at the club from 1959 until 1960.

The majority of coaches Alianza have had have been Salvadorians. Of the 50 coaches to have managed Alianza, 19 have been Salvadorians and 31 foreigners.  In some cases, the Salvadorian coaches have been former players of the club that agreed to take charge after the sacking of the regular coach that season.

The main nationalities of the coaches of Alianza barring Salvadorians have been Uruguayan (8 coaches), Argentina (8 coaches), and Chilean (4).  The club has also had two Serbian coaches, 2 Brazilians, 2 Colombians, a Mexican, an Italian, a Paraguayan, and a Spanish.

Managers 
Only first-team competitive matches are counted.
Statistics are updated up to 19 November 2022.

Table key
 
 

List of Head Coaches of Alianza F.C. from when the club was formed:

By number of trophies
Only managers who have won at least one trophy are mentioned.

Alianza F.C.